The 1930 California gubernatorial election was held on November 4, 1930. James Rolph had defeated incumbent governor C. C. Young and former lieutenant governor Buron Fitts for the Republican nomination.

General election results

References
 Our Campaigns

Gubernatorial
California
1930
November 1930 events